Aaker or Åker is a surname. Notable people with the surname include:

 David Aaker (born 1938), American business consultant and author
 Drengman Aaker (1839–1894), American businessman and politician
 Jedediah Aaker (born 1975), American actor
 Jennifer Aaker (born 1967), American social psychiatrist
 Jon Åker (1927–2013), Norwegian hospital manager
 Lars K. Aaker (1825–1895), American businessman, farmer, and politician
 Lee Aaker (1943–2021), American child actor
 Richard Aaker Trythall (born 1939), American-Italian composer

References